Daraz-e Now (also Romanized as Darāz-e Now and Derāz-e Now) is a village in Chaharkuh Rural District, in the Central District of Kordkuy County, Golestan Province, Iran. At the 2006 census, its population was 56, in 25 families.

References 

Populated places in Kordkuy County